The 1944 Istanbul Football Cup season was the third season of the cup. Beşiktaş JK won the cup for the first time. The tournament was single-elimination.

Season

Quarterfinals

|}

|}

Semifinals

|}

|}

Final
September 10, 1944
Attendance:10,000
Şeref Stadium

|}
Goals For Beşiktaş JK: Sabri Gençsoy(28 min.), Hakkı Yeten(50 min.), Vecdi Çapa(53 min.)
Goals For Fenerbahçe SK: Müzdat Yetkiner(18 min.)

References

Istanbul Football Cup
Istanbul